The 2013–14 season was Hibernian's fifteenth consecutive season in the top flight of the Scottish football league system, having been promoted from the Scottish First Division at the end of the 1998–99 season. Having lost the 2013 Scottish Cup Final to league champions Celtic, Hibs entered the 2013–14 UEFA Europa League, but suffered a Scottish record aggregate defeat against Swedish club Malmö in the second qualifying round. Hibs also competed in the 2013–14 Scottish League Cup but lost to Heart of Midlothian in the quarter final at Easter Road. Days after that defeat, manager Pat Fenlon resigned and was replaced with Terry Butcher. Hibs were knocked out of the 2013–14 Scottish Cup in the fifth round by Raith Rovers. A long winless run to finish the 2013–14 Scottish Premiership season meant that Hibs finished in 11th place, and they were relegated after a playoff against Hamilton Academical.

Friendlies
With qualifying matches in the 2013–14 UEFA Europa League due to be played in July, Hibs started pre-season training just a few weeks after playing in the 2013 Scottish Cup Final. The club set up a week-long training camp in southern Spain, including two matches.

Fixtures

Europa League
Having lost the 2013 Scottish Cup Final to league champions Celtic, Hibs qualified for the 2013–14 UEFA Europa League competition. The club entered at the second qualifying round stage, but were unseeded. Hibs were drawn against the winners of a first round tie between Malmö and Drogheda United. Malmö progressed to the second round with a 2–0 aggregate victory against Drogheda. Hibs lost the first leg 2–0 in Malmö and they were eliminated after suffering a 7–0 defeat in the home leg, losing 9–0 on aggregate. This broke the Scottish record for margin of defeat in European competition, previously held by Rangers in the 1959–60 European Cup.

Fixtures

Scottish Premiership
The 2013–14 Scottish Premiership season began on 3 August 2013 and the fixture list was announced on 19 June. The season got off to a poor start for Hibs, as they lost in their first two league matches, at home to Motherwell and then in the first Edinburgh derby of the season. Hibs then had a better run of form, losing only one of their next eight league matches. At the end of a week in which Hibs lost at home to Aberdeen in the league and Hearts in the 2013–14 Scottish League Cup, manager Pat Fenlon resigned. Assistant manager Jimmy Nicholl was put in caretaker charge of the team until Inverness CT manager Terry Butcher was recruited to replace Fenlon. Hibs drew 0–0 at St Mirren in his first game in charge. A run of 1 win in 11 games meant that Hibs again finished in the bottom half of the league and were dragged into a battle to avoid a relegation play-off. A run of 13 games without a win to finish the 2013–14 Scottish Premiership season meant that Hibs fell into a relegation play-off. A 2–0 win in the first leg against Hamilton Academical gave Hibs fresh hope of avoiding relegation, but they lost 2–0 in the return game and lost the tie after a penalty shootout.

Fixtures

Premiership play-offs

Scottish Cup
As a Premiership club, Hibs entered the 2013–14 Scottish Cup in the fourth round and were drawn away to fellow Premiership club Ross County. Hibs progressed to the last 16 with a 1–0 victory at Victoria Park, recording their first ever win against Ross County. In the fifth round (last 16) draw, Hibs were given a home tie against Championship club Raith Rovers. Hibs were knocked out of the competition by Raith, who won 3–2 at Easter Road.

Fixtures

Scottish League Cup
As a club that qualified for European competition, Hibs entered the 2013–14 Scottish League Cup in the third round. In the third round draw Hibs were given a home tie against Stranraer. Liam Craig scored a hat-trick for Hibs as they progressed to the quarter-final with a 5–3 victory. Hibs were given another home draw in the quarter-final as they were paired with Edinburgh derby rivals Hearts. Despite entering the match as favourites against a youthful Hearts side, Hibs squandered several early chances and lost 1–0. Pat Fenlon resigned two days later, although he claimed that he had already decided before the cup match to leave.

Fixtures

Transfers
In January 2013, Hibs announced the pre-contract signing of St Johnstone midfielder Liam Craig. Ryan McGivern, who had been on loan at Hibs for most of the 2012–13 season, and Inverness midfielder Owain Tudur Jones were signed towards the end of May. Hibs had hoped to retain the services of on-loan striker Leigh Griffiths, but his parent club Wolves rejected all offers for the player. Hibs instead paid £200,000 to acquire Swindon Town striker James Collins.

Early in the January 2014 window, BBC Sport reported that new manager Terry Butcher had made Rowan Vine, Tom Taiwo, Tim Clancy and Kevin Thomson available for transfer. Butcher refused to confirm the report, but said that allowing some players to leave would freshen the squad and that he was also looking to recruit some new players. On the final day of January, Hibs completed loan deals for three English players: Daniel Boateng, Danny Haynes and Duncan Watmore. Vine and Clancy had their contracts cancelled by mutual consent.

Players in

Players out

Loans in

Loans out

Deaths
22 July: Lawrie Reilly, 84, Hibernian and Scotland player; member of the Famous Five forward line.
24 August: Gerry Baker, 75, Hibernian, Motherwell and St Mirren forward.
22 December: David Paul, 18, Hibernian youth player.

Player statistics
During the 2013–14 season, Hibs used 28 different players in competitive games. The table below shows the number of appearances and goals scored by each player.

Team statistics

League table

Division summary

Management statistics

See also
List of Hibernian F.C. seasons

Notes

References

2013andndash;14
Hibernian
Hibernian